Domino Saints is a Puerto Rican urban pop duo based in Miami, Florida and formed in 2011. Fun, sexy, and energetic are the best words to describe Domino Saints, the Puerto Rican urban pop duo formed by
Gigi Ojeda and David Leal, whose modern musical project promises to occupy a significant place within the landscape of today's Latin music market. The group gained a sizable following after the release of the music video for their single "Malas Mañas" in August 2012.

The band followed up with their next single, "Exclusivo", which was released on May 29, 2013. Following their split with Capitol Latin, they released the single, "Ya Quiero" on July 8, 2016 that give them their first Billboard Tropical Number #1. On February 10, 2017 they released their song "Las Ganas"  followed by "Ponte Sexy" on February 24, 2017. Their latest single "Mi Orgullo" was released on May 19, 2017, in 2018 they were selected to represent Puerto Rico at Chile's Viña Del Mar Festival with this song. Now in 2020, they are released their first full-length album titled "Island Kings," which was released via their own label Saints Republic.

During the 2021 Copa América semi-final match between Argentina and Colombia on July 6, 2021, the duo premiered the music video of their single “Dancefreak” off of their upcoming visual project dubbed 'Future Love Games'.

Members 
Current members
 Giselle "Gigi" Ojeda – lead vocals (2011–present)
 David Leal – lead vocals (2011–present)

Discography

LPs

EPs

Singles 
2021 - My Way (Just Dance 2022 Edit)
2020 - No Es Pecado
2020 - Boca A Boca
2020 - Sol Y Playa
2020 - Animal
2020 - Body
2020 - Wine
2019 - Dutty Love
2019 - A La Buena
2017 - Mi Orgullo
2017 - Ponte Sexy
2017 - Las Ganas
2016 - Ya Quiero
2014 - Tesoro 
2013 - Exclusivo
2012 - Malas Mañas
2011 - Ahora es Ahora

References

External links 

Musical groups established in 2012
Musical groups from Miami
2012 establishments in Florida